Canaan Baptist Church may refer to:

Canaan Baptist Church (Bessemer, Alabama), listed on the NRHP in Alabama 
Canaan Baptist Church (Texarkana, Arkansas), listed on the NRHP in Arkansas 
Canaan Baptist Church (Covington, Tennessee), listed on the NRHP in Tennessee